Broad Street United Methodist Church is a historic Methodist church located at 155 Central Ave NW (263 Broad Street,  NW) in Cleveland, Tennessee, United States.

The Broad Street United Methodist congregation traces its history to 1836, when Methodists met for worship in the Bradley County Courthouse in Cleveland. From 1836 until 1893, when the church's current building was completed, the congregation was based at four different sites in the city. It was known at one time as Lea Street Methodist Episcopal Church.

In 1863, during the Civil War, the church's building at the corner of  Church and First Streets was taken over by the Union Army and used as a stable and granary. In 1867-1868, the congregation erected a new brick building at the present church location. In 1893, that building was demolished and the current church building was constructed on the same site. It is designed in the Romanesque Revival style, with an Akron plan sanctuary. Additions were made to the building in 1922 and 1968.

The church building was added to the National Register of Historic Places in 1984.

References

Further reading
 Trewhitt, Katharine L. 1984. History of Broad Street United Methodist Church, Cleveland, Tennessee, 1836-1984: The Story of Methodism in Bradley County and of the Group which Became Broad Street United Methodist Church

External links
Broad Street UMC Congregation website

United Methodist churches in Tennessee
Churches on the National Register of Historic Places in Tennessee
Churches completed in 1893
19th-century Methodist church buildings in the United States
Churches in Bradley County, Tennessee
Cleveland, Tennessee
Akron Plan church buildings
National Register of Historic Places in Bradley County, Tennessee
1893 establishments in Tennessee
Romanesque Revival architecture in Tennessee
Individually listed contributing properties to historic districts on the National Register in Tennessee